Franz Albert Seyn (Frants Albert Alexandrovich Zeyn; 27 July 1862 – summer 1918) was a Russian general who was Governor-General of Finland between 24 November 1909 and 16 March 1917.

Before he became Governor-General Seyn had been a staff officer in the military district of Finland and an aide to the Governor-General. Seyn contributed in the Russification of Finland as he followed in the foot-steps of his assassinated (1904) predecessor, Governor-General Nikolai Ivanovich Bobrikov. Finnish autonomy was further limited and in laws passed in 1908 and 1910 the Duma, instead of the Finnish Diet, was given rights to make laws concerning the Grand Duchy of Finland.

After the February Revolution the Russian Provisional Government arrested Seyn on 16 March 1917 and brought him to Petrograd where he apparently was killed the next year.

Awards 
 Order of Saint Anna, 1st class 
 Order of Saint Anna, 3rd class
 Order of the White Eagle 
 Order of Saint Stanislaus, 1st class
 Order of Saint Stanislaus, 2nd class 
 Order of St. Vladimir, 2nd class
 Order of St. Vladimir, 3rd class 
 Order of St. Vladimir, 4th class 
 Order of Saint Stanislaus, 3rd class

Sources
 Pertti Luntinen: F. A. Seyn 1862 - 1918 - A Political Biography of a tsarist Imperialist as Administrator of Finland, Helsinky, 1985, in English.

External links
 Short biography with 1910 photo

|-

1862 births
1918 deaths
Governors of the Grand Duchy of Finland
Prisoners of the Peter and Paul Fortress
Military personnel from Vitebsk